Andrew Alan Gaskill (born December 29, 1951), nicknamed "Andy", is an American animator, art director, and storyboard artist at Walt Disney Animation Studios. His work with the animation studio includes Winnie the Pooh and Tigger Too, The Rescuers, The Fox and the Hound, The Little Mermaid, and The Lion King.

Gaskill was chosen as art director for The Lion King after Disney executives saw storyboards that he created for one of the film's songs.

Biography 
Gaskill was born in Camden, New Jersey to an American soldier in the Pacific who was stationed in Tokyo, Japan, after the war, where he met and married a Japanese woman. Gaskill graduated in 1969 from Camden Catholic High School.

References

External links 

 

1951 births
Living people
Camden Catholic High School alumni
People from Camden, New Jersey
20th-century American writers
21st-century American writers
Walt Disney Animation Studios people
American art directors
American storyboard artists
American animators